Acronyctodes is a genus of moths in the family Geometridae first described by Henry Edwards in 1884.

Species
 Acronyctodes cautama (Schaus, 1901)
 Acronyctodes colorata (Warren, 1901)
 Acronyctodes insignita H. Edwards, 1884
 Acronyctodes leonilaria (Hoffmann, 1936)
 Acronyctodes mexicanaria (Walker, 1860)
 Acronyctodes thinballa (Dyar, 1916)

References

Geometridae genera
Ennominae